Laura Nicholls may refer to:

 Laura Nicholls (swimmer) (born 1978), Canadian Olympic freestyle swimmer
 Laura Nicholls (basketball) (born 1989), Spanish Olympic basketball player